Chloromiza is a genus of moth in the family Geometridae.

References

Ennominae